Oxford University Innovation Limited (OUI) is a British technology transfer and consultancy company created to manage the research and development (R&D) of University spin-offs. OUI is a wholly owned subsidiary of the University of Oxford, and is located on Botley Road, Oxford, England. OUI was previously known as Isis Innovation (1988–2016) and Oxford University Research and Development Ltd (1987–1988).

Overview
The company was established in 1987 as Oxford University Research and Development Ltd and was renamed Isis Innovation a year later, becoming Oxford University Innovation in 2016. Oxford University Innovation and its sub-divisions manage the university's intellectual property (IP) portfolio, working with University academics and researchers who wish to commercialise their work by identifying, protecting and marketing technologies through patenting and licensing, spin-off company formation, consulting and material sales.

Oxford University Innovation provides researchers with commercial advice, funds patent applications and legal costs, negotiates third-party licences and spin-out company agreements, and identifies and manages consultancy opportunities for University of Oxford academics. Oxford University Innovation works on projects from all of the university's research divisions: medical sciences, mathematical, physical & life sciences, humanities and social sciences. Current and former members of the board of directors include Liam Dolan, Stephen G. Davies, Lionel Tarassenko, John Bell, Mike Brady and David Cooksey.

Patents, licensing, and spin-outs
Oxford University Innovation files, on average, one patent application each week, manages over 360 patent application families and has concluded over 450 licence agreements which has made Oxford University Innovation "one of the country’s most prolific technology transfer offices when it comes to agreeing licensing deals". 
According to 2012 figures from the World Intellectual Property Organization (WIPO), Oxford University Innovation is the 4th largest filer of Patent Cooperation Treaty (PCT) patent applications in the UK and the highest European university applicant. Oxford University Innovation licenses technologies to companies who invest in developing and selling the products in a timely and ethical manner. Licensees are sought from all technology and business sectors on an international basis.

Oxford University Innovation works with University researchers to develop new business opportunities, identifying and sourcing investment, management and professional services. Since 1988 Oxford University Innovation has assisted in the formation of more than 70 University spin-out companies, generating over £2 billion in unquoted and quoted market valuations for the University of Oxford. Notable spin-outs include:

NaturalMotion – film and computer games animation developer, known for their Euphoria software used in Rockstar North's title Grand Theft Auto IV (GTA IV).
Intelligent Sustainable Energy – Company creating advanced analysis software for domestic smart meters
Oxford GlycoSciences – biotechnology firm founded by Raymond Dwek
Oxford-Emergent Tuberculosis Consortium – a joint venture between the University of Oxford and Emergent BioSolutions formed to develop a new tuberculosis vaccine with the aid of AERAS.
Oxitec – a biotechnology company which develops genetically modified insects to assist in insect control.
 Oxford Nanopore Technologies a company using nanopore sequencing founded by Hagan Bayley et al.
 Oxford Photovoltaics a solar energy company using photovoltaics and perovskite solar cells founded by Henry Snaith et al.
PowderJect Pharmaceuticals (1993–2003) – a vaccine, drug and diagnostics delivery company founded by Brian Bellhouse.
Immunocore – immunotherapy company developing soluble TCR-based therapies against cancer, infectious diseases, and autoimmune disease.
Vaccitech – biotechnology company developing vaccines and immunotherapies for infectious diseases and cancer, such as hepatitis B, HPV and prostate cancer.

Oxford University Innovation's divisions
Oxford University Innovation is split into three divisions, dedicated to different areas of knowledge transfer. Alongside the central Technology Transfer group that deals exclusively with disclosures and patent applications from University of Oxford researchers, Oxford University Innovation manages:

Innovation, angel investors and incubators

Oxford Innovation Society (OIS)
The Oxford Innovation Society (OIS), founded in 1990, is a forum for Open Innovation, bringing together researchers and inventors, Oxford spin-outs, technology transfer professionals, local companies, venture capital groups and some of the world's most innovative multinationals. The society allows companies to have a "window" on Oxford science and fosters links between business and the academic community. Members receive an advance notification of all patent applications marketed by Oxford University Innovation, invitations to networking opportunities at formal OIS dinners, customised research presentations and bespoke seminars for technology roadmapping and strategic planning.

Isis Angels Network (IAN)
The Isis Angels Network (IAN) introduces private investors and seed/venture capitalists interested in investing in spin-out companies from the University of Oxford to investment opportunities. IAN is a not-for-profit company limited by guarantee, established by the then Isis in 1999.

Oxford University Innovation also administers the Oxford University Challenge Seed Fund (UCSF), which was launched in 1999 with investment from the UK Treasury, Wellcome Trust and Gatsby Foundation. The £4 million Oxford UCSF has invested in over 100 projects, ranging in size from £1,700 to £250,000. The overall objective of the UCSF scheme is to enable universities to access seed funds in order to assist the successful transformation of good research into good business.

In 2010, Oxford University Innovation (then Isis Innovation) – in conjunction with the university’s 'Oxford Thinking' campaign – created the Oxford Invention Fund (OIF). The open fund allows anyone to donate money which goes towards helping create prototypes or proof-of-concept models from ideas and technologies developed at Oxford to improve the transfer into a commercial setting.

Oxford University Innovation manages the licensing of copyrighted Patient Reported Outcomes (PROs) questionnaires via its Isis Outcomes brand. These questionnaires, developed within the university, are used for academic and commercial clinical studies into a variety of illnesses, including parkinson’s disease and endometriosis. The negotiation of sales agreements for biological and physical science materials such as cell lines and antibodies are also handled by Isis Innovation.

Isis Startup Incubator (ISI)
Since 2010, Oxford University Innovation has run the Isis startup Incubator (ISI), a business incubator designed to support very early-stage software ventures from students, staff and alumni of the University of Oxford; the Incubator offers physical space and IT facilities as well as commercial mentoring, funding support and business networking facilitation. Oxford University Innovation has links with all the parts of the university involved in technology commercialisation and enterprise. These include: 
Research Services
Begbroke Science Park
Oxford Science Enterprise Centre
Entrepreneurship Said, at the Saïd Business School.

Oxford Spin-out Equity Management (OSEM) was created in 2008 and works closely with Oxford University Innovation and the University of Oxford’s Finance Division to manage the university’s shareholdings in its spin-out companies and optimising returns on University investments.

References

1988 establishments in England
Technology companies established in 1988
Companies based in Oxford
Companies associated with the University of Oxford
Technology companies of the United Kingdom
Technology transfer
Innovation in the United Kingdom